Take Aim is a 1974 two-part Soviet biographical drama film directed by Igor Talankin.

Plot
The film depicts the nuclear arms race that took place between all sides in the World War II and the beginning of the Cold War. The first part centers on the war years, dealing with the Manhattan Project and the American effort to beat the Germans to the bomb, as well as with Stalin's decision that the USSR must have its own atomic project. The second part displays the Soviet post-war nuclear program. The plot deals mainly with the personal dilemmas facing all the scientists who worked on the atomic weapons.

Production
The film was produced solely by Mosfilm, without a direct participation of DEFA, and yet several East German actors were invited to play the German historical figures. Fritz Diez, who appeared as Hitler on screen for the sixth time in his career, was also given the role of Otto Hahn. 

The producers faced a technical difficulty in a scene which contained a nuclear explosion. After several experiments, the special effects coordinator, Samir Jaber - a Syrian citizen who worked for Mosfilm - decided to create the required sequence by trickling a drop of orange-tinted perfume into a watery solution of aniline and filming it close up.

Reception
The film won the 1975 Kishinev All-Union Film Festival Grand Prize. Talankin received the Silver Pyramide in the 1977 Cairo International Film Festival.

Cast
Sergei Bondarchuk – Igor Kurchatov
Georgiy Zhzhonov – Vitaly Petrovich Zubavin
Nikolai Volkov – Abram Ioffe
Irina Skobtseva – Marina Dmitriyevna Kurchatova
Nikolai Burlyayev – Fedya
Alla Pokrovskaya – Tanya
Yakov Tripolsky – Joseph Stalin
Mikhail Ulyanov – Georgy Zhukov
Nikolai Zasukhin – Vyacheslav Molotov
Sergei Yursky – J. Robert Oppenheimer
Erich Gerberding – Leslie Groves
Oleg Basilashvili – Boris Pash
Alla Demidova – Jane
Innokenty Smoktunovsky – Franklin D. Roosevelt
Jerzy Kaliszewski – Harry S. Truman
Horst Schulze – Werner Heisenberg
Miloš Nedbal – Max von Laue
Fritz Diez – Otto Hahn/Adolf Hitler
Siegfried Weiß – Niels Bohr
Mark Prudkin – Albert Einstein
Boris Ivanov – Leó Szilárd
Nikolai Lebedev – energy minister
Sergei Kurilov – Vladimir Vernadsky

References

External links
Take Aim on the IMDb.
1974 drama films
1974 films
1970s biographical drama films
Biographical films about scientists
Cultural depictions of Adolf Hitler
Cultural depictions of Albert Einstein
Cultural depictions of Franklin D. Roosevelt
Cultural depictions of Georgy Zhukov
Cultural depictions of Harry S. Truman
Cultural depictions of J. Robert Oppenheimer
Cultural depictions of Joseph Stalin
Films about nuclear war and weapons
Films directed by Igor Talankin
Mosfilm films
Russian biographical drama films
1970s Russian-language films
Soviet biographical drama films
Soviet World War II films